Eduthanivayal is a village in the Pattukkottai taluk of Thanjavur district, Tamil Nadu, India.

Demographics 

As per the 2001 census, Eduthanivayal had a total population of 345 with 174 males and 171 females. The sex ratio was 983. The literacy rate was 52.4.

References 

 

Villages in Thanjavur district